Shwepyitha Township is located in the northwestern part of Yangon, Myanmar. The township comprises 27 wards and 3 village tracts, and shares borders with Htantabin Township to the north, Mingaladon Township to the east, the Yangon river to the west, and Insein Township to the south. Incorporated into the city of Yangon in 1986, Shwepyitha is now developing and has basic municipal services. Improvements include tidy and broad main roads and many streets form a grid. Hlaing River separates Shwepyithar and Hlaingtharyar. Shwepyithar Bridge was built in 1996 and now it is a useful bridge in Yangon and is also the start of the Yangon-Pathein-Chaungthar Highway. Htan Chuak Pin Junction is regarded as the centre of Shwepyithar and many well known places are there. Shwepyithar Advanced Theatre (3D) was opened in March 2017. There are many gyms and shops around its centre.
At night, the street-market of Htan Chauk Pin offers dining. Ruby Market is the most famous market. Bogyoke Aungsan Road, Bayint Naung Road, No.4 Highway, etc. are the most popular roads in the town. The Yangon Circular Railway passes through the township. Its railway station is also at the Yangon-Pyay-Mandalay Railway.
Many Language Centres teach English, Korean, Japanese and Chinese. Many advanced restaurants and hotels as well as motels are there. Many job opportunities can be available in Shwepyithar because it has the Shwepyithar Industrial Zone, Warr Ta Ya Industrial Zone and Thardukan Industrial Zone.Dagon Beverage Company Limited also exists there. 
Shwe Pyi Thar is an up-and-coming Yangon township.

Education
The township has 50 primary schools, 20 middle schools and 7 high schools.
The most famous high school is B.E.H.S no.1 and B.E.H.S no.3. There are nearly 30 middle (branch) schools and 10 high (branch) schools. Private schools include Kaung Su San, Aung Thukha, New Life, Myint Mo Yape, Education Palace, etc. University of Computer Studies, Yangon and Government Technical Institute (Shwe Pyi Thar) are located there, too.

References

Townships of Yangon